That Christmas Feeling is the tenth album (and first Christmas album) by American singer-guitarist Glen Campbell, released in 1968 by Capitol Records.

Reissues
While the album has never been formally reissued on CD in the United States, the Netherlands-based Disky Records label issued a CD version (with different cover art) in 2003. In 2010 Capitol Records Nashville made the album available as a digital download, with the original cover art and two bonus tracks ("The Night Before Christmas" and "Silent Night") taken from the 1969 BFGoodrich compilation album The Christmas Sound of Music. In 2013, Capitol Records reissued it in the United States, but with a different title (Icon Christmas) and cover art. It was reissued in 2016 on Vinyl, by Capital UMe a Universal Company  with the original cover art.

Track listing
Side 1
 "Christmas Is for Children" (Sammy Cahn, Jimmy Van Heusen) – 3:18
 "Old Toy Trains" (Roger Miller) – 2:15
 "Little Altar Boy" (Howlett Smith) – 3:57
 "It Must Be Getting Close to Christmas" (Sammy Cahn, Jimmy Van Heusen) – 2:25
 "Have Yourself a Merry Little Christmas" (Hugh Martin, Ralph Blane) – 3:03
 "Blue Christmas" (Billy Hayes, Jay Johnson) – 2:33
 
Side 2
 "The Christmas Song" (Mel Tormé, Robert Wells) – 2:59
 "Pretty Paper" (Willie Nelson) – 2:31
 "There's No Place Like Home" (Bishop Payne; adapted by Sammy Cahn) – 3:15
 "I'll Be Home for Christmas" (Kim Gannon, Walter Kent, Buck Ram) – 3:00
 "Christmas Day" (Jimmy Holiday, L. White) – 2:50

Personnel
Music
 Glen Campbell – vocals, acoustic guitar

Production
 Al De Lory – producer, arranger, and conductor
 Rick Rankin/Capitol Photo Studio – photography

Charts
Album – Billboard (United States)

Singles – Billboard (United States)

References

Glen Campbell albums
1968 Christmas albums
Christmas albums by American artists
Capitol Records Christmas albums
Country Christmas albums
Albums recorded at Capitol Studios